The Canton of Perpignan-3 is a French canton of Pyrénées-Orientales department, in Occitanie.

Composition
The canton includes the commune of Cabestany and the southeastern part of Perpignan. At the French canton reorganisation which came into effect in March 2015, the canton was enlarged.

Before 2015, the canton included Cabestany and the following neighbourhoods of Perpignan:
 Saint-Gaudérique
 Champ de Mars
 Saint-Vincens

References 

Perpignan 3